The Lockheed Martin A-4AR Fightinghawk is a major upgrade of the McDonnell Douglas A-4M Skyhawk attack aircraft developed for the Argentine Air Force which entered service in 1998. The program was named Fightinghawk in recognition of the F-16 Fighting Falcon, which was the source of its new avionics.

Design and development

Background

The Falklands War in 1982 took a heavy toll on the Argentine Air Force, which lost over 60 aircraft.

The supply of modern combat aircraft had been restricted since the United States had imposed an arms embargo in 1978 for human rights abuses; there were further restrictions when the United Kingdom also imposed an arms embargo in 1982. The only combat aircraft that the Air Force could obtain were 10 Mirage 5Ps transferred from the Peruvian Air Force, 19 Six-Day War veteran Mirage IIICJs from Israel, and 2 Mirage IIIB trainers from the French Air Force.

In 1989, Carlos Menem was elected President of Argentina and quickly established a pro-United States foreign policy which led to the country gaining Major non-NATO ally status. Although the economic situation improved, the funds to purchase new combat aircraft like the Mirage 2000 remained unavailable.

In 1994, the United States made a counteroffer to modernize 36 former US Marine Corps A-4M Skyhawks in a US$282 million deal that would be carried out by Lockheed Martin and included the privatization of the Fabrica Militar de Aviones (Military Aircraft Factory - FMA), which was renamed Lockheed Martin Aircraft Argentina SA (LMAASA) afterward. In 2010, LMAASA reverted to the Argentine government as Fabrica Argentina de Aviones (FADEA).

Production

Argentine Air Force technicians chose 32 A-4M (built between 1970/1976) and 4 TA-4F airframes from the Aerospace Maintenance and Regeneration Center at Davis-Monthan Air Force Base in Tucson, Arizona to upgrade. The upgrade plans included:

 Complete overhaul of the airframe, wiring looms and the Pratt & Whitney J52P-408A engine
 Installation of Douglas Escapac 1-G3 ejection seats
 HGU-55/P helmets
 Honeywell Normal Air-Garrett's OBOGS (On Board Oxygen Generation System)
 Westinghouse/Northrop Grumman AN/APG-66V2 (ARG-1) radar
 HOTAS controls and a 'glass' cockpit (2 CRT color screens)
 Sextant Avionique/Thales Avionics SHUD
 Litton/Northrop Grumman LN-100G inertial navigation system
 MIL-STD-1553B data bus
 Two General Dynamics Information Systems AN/AYK-14 mission computers
 Northrop Grumman AN/ALR-93 (V)1 Radar warning receiver
 AN/ALQ-126B jammer
 AN/ALQ-162 jammer
 ALR-47 chaff/flare dispenser
 AN/APX-72 IFF

The A-4Ms were equipped with the TV and laser spot tracker Hughes AN/ASB-19 Angle Rate Bombing System, but this was removed after the conversion into A-4ARs, as the radar could provide the same data.

The contract stipulated that 8 airframes would be refurbished at the Lockheed-Martin Plant in Palmdale, California and the rest (27) in Córdoba, Argentina at LMAASA. At least ten TA-4J and A-4M airframes for use as spare parts, eight additional engines, and a new A-4AR simulator were also delivered.

Operational history

The Fightinghawks, having received Air Force serials C-901 to C-936, saw their first group arrive in Argentina on 18 December 1997 and the first "Argentine" A-4AR was rolled out on 3 August 1998 at Cordoba. The last one,  number 936, was delivered to the Air Force in March 2000. Two aircraft (a one-seat and a two-seat) remained some time in the United States  for weapons homologation. All of the A-4ARs were delivered to the 5th Air Brigade (V Brigada Aérea) at Villa Reynolds, San Luis Province, where they replaced two squadrons of Falklands/Malvinas veteran A-4P (locally known as A-4B) and A-4C. They were soon deployed in rotation around the country from Rio Gallegos in the south to Resistencia in the north where they were used to intercept smugglers and drug trafficking airplanes.

In September 1998, just months after their arrival and again in April 2001,  United States Air Force F-16s visited Villa Reynolds for the Southern Falcon joint exercise, known as Aguila (Spanish for Eagle) in Argentina. In 2004, the A-4ARs went abroad for the joint exercise Cruzex, along with Brazilian F-5s and Mirages, Venezuelan F-16s and French Mirage 2000s.

In November 2005 they were deployed to Tandil airbase to enforce a no-fly zone for the Mar del Plata Summit of the Americas and later met Chilean Mirage Elkans, Brazilian AMXs and Uruguayan A-37 at Mendoza for the joint exercise Ceibo.

In July 2006 they were deployed to Cordoba province for the Mercosur's 30th Presidents Summit, while in August and September they went north again to Brazil for the Cruzex III joint exercise with Brazil, Chile, France, Peru, Uruguay and Venezuela.

In June 2008 they were deployed to Tucumán province for the Mercosur's Presidents Summit.

In August 2009 they were deployed to Bariloche for the UNASUR Presidents summit. Later that month they participated at Reconquista, Santa Fe of the Pre-Salitre  official video an exercise of preparation for the Salitre II oficial video of next October in Chile with Chile, Brazil, France and the United States.<ref>[http://www.presalitre.faa.mil.ar/  ejercicio pre salitre 2009''' FAA site] </ref>

On 1 May 2010 they participated in the Air Fest 2010 show at Morón Airport and Air Base.video On 25 May 2010 three A-4AR flew over the 9 de Julio Avenue at Buenos Aires as part of the Argentina Bicentennial shows.<ref>[http://blogs.perfil.com/armas/2010/05/26/a-4-ar-volando-en-el-cielo-del-bicentenario/ A-AR volando en el cielo del Bicentenario' Perfil Blogs] </ref>

In August 2010, the aircraft enforced a no-fly zone at San Juan for the Mercosur's Presidents Summit. On September they joined the rest of the air force aircraft at Reconquista, Santa Fe for the ICARO III integration manoeuvers. On November they deployed to Tandil airbase for the XX Ibero-American Summit held at Mar del Plata.

In January 2016, Argentine Minister of Defence Julio Martinez confirmed that all Air Force Lockheed Martin A-4AR Skyhawk (Fightinghawk) fighters were grounded. Originally this was due to the expiry of the explosive cartridges in their ejection seats, but later it became apparent that there were additional problems. Only 4-5 were found airworthy with the rest in storage at Villa Reynolds.

In May 2017, they participated in the celebrations of the 2017 anniversary of the May Revolution.

By 2020, as few as six of the aircraft were still reported as operational.

Variants
A-4AR  32 converted from A-4Ms
OA-4AR  4 converted from TA-4Fs

Operators

 Argentine Air Force - 36 received (32 A-4AR, 4 OA-4AR); as few as 6 reported operational in 2020; operational availability reported in 2022 at perhaps 15-20% of 23 aircraft

Accidents
 four of the type have been lost in 20 years of service:

 6 July 2005: A-4AR registration C-906 near Justo Daract, San Luis Province, pilot Lt Horacio Martín Flores (29 years old) died.
 24 August 2005: A-4AR registration C-936 near Río Cuarto, Cordoba, pilot ejected safely.
 14 February 2013: OA-4AR registration C-902 crashed on landing at Angel Aragonés airport near Santiago del Estero, both pilots ejected safely.
 5 August 2020: A-4AR registration C-925 near Villa Reynolds, San Luís, pilot Cpt Gonzalo Fabián Britos Venturini ejected but was found dead.

Specifications (A-4AR Fightinghawk)

See also

References

 

External links

  Argentine Air Force
  Aerospacio Magazine El programa A-4AR avanza  Aerospacio Magazine Halcones al Sur, llegan los A-4AR  La Nacion newspaper 1997  Nuevos aviones para la Fuerza Aérea  La Nacion newspaper 1998  Ejercicio militar con los EE.UU  La Nacion newspaper 1998  Aviones argentinos interceptarán aeronaves norteamericanas  La Nacion newspaper 2005  Habilitan un puente aéreo con EE.UU.''
  "A-4M Skyhawk II y el A-4AR Fightinghawk" 

A-004AR
1990s Argentine attack aircraft
Single-engined jet aircraft
Low-wing aircraft
A-4AR
Aircraft first flown in 1997